Rudolf Höll (born 15 July 1911; date of death unknown) is an Austrian bobsledder who competed in the mid-1930s. He finished 11th in the four-man event at the 1936 Winter Olympics in Garmisch-Partenkirchen.

References
1936 bobsleigh four-man results
1936 Olympic Winter Games official report - p. 415.
Rudolf Höll's profile at Sports Reference.com

1911 births
Year of death missing
Austrian male bobsledders
Olympic bobsledders of Austria
Bobsledders at the 1936 Winter Olympics